

The Siemens-Schuckert D.III was a German single-seat fighter built by Siemens-Schuckert Werke. The D.III was a development of the earlier Siemens-Schuckert D.IIc prototype. The D.III was an (nearly) equal-span biplane powered by a 160 hp (119 kW) Siemens-Halske Sh.III bi-rotary engine. Idflieg placed an order for 20 aircraft in December 1917, followed by a second order of 30 aircraft in February 1918.

Operational history
Approximately 41 D.IIIs were delivered to frontline units between April and May 1918. Most aircraft were supplied to Jagdgeschwader II, whose pilots were enthusiastic about the new aircraft's handling and rate of climb. After only seven to 10 hours of service, however, the Sh.III engines started showing serious problems with overheating and piston seizure. The problem was later traced to the Voltol mineral oil that was used to replace the now-scarce castor oil. Furthermore, the close-fitting engine cowling provided inadequate cooling to the engine.

In late May 1918, Jagdgeschwader II replaced its D.IIIs with the older Fokker Dr.I. The remaining D.III aircraft were returned to the Siemens-Schuckert factory, where they were retrofitted with new Sh.IIIa engines, an enlarged rudder, and cutaway cowlings that provided improved airflow. A further 30 new production D.IIIs incorporated these modifications. Total production amounted to 80 aircraft.

In July 1918, the D.III returned to active service as an interceptor with home defense squadrons. By this time, the D.III had been replaced in production by the Siemens-Schuckert D.IV.

Operators

Luftstreitkräfte

Swiss Air Force

Specifications

References

Notes

Bibliography

 Gray, Peter and Owen Thetford. German Aircraft of the First World War. London: Putnam, 1962. .
 Green, William and Gordon Swanborough. The Complete Book of Fighters. London: Salamander Books, 1994. . 
 VanWyngarden, Greg. Jagdgeschwader Nr II Geschwader 'Berthold' (Aviation Elite Units No. 19). Oxford: Osprey Publishing, 2005. .

1910s German fighter aircraft
D.III
Sesquiplanes
Single-engined tractor aircraft
Aircraft first flown in 1917
Rotary-engined aircraft